Sinch Bikes is an electric bicycle company based in New Zealand. Sinch Bikes was founded by Stephen James and Kim Struthers – the son of John Struthers, who was the founder of New Zealand's best-known bicycle company Avanti.

History
Stephen James and Kim Struthers, whose father John Struthers founded Avanti Bicycles in the 1980s, launched Sinch Bikes in 2019. Sinch Bikes focuses on e-bikes.

Sinch Bike's parent company is Delve DMD. It currently has 32 locations in New Zealand.

Sinch Bikes has also partnered with Shimano and only uses mid-drive Shimano systems.

Models
The bicycles are designed for diverse users, ranging from serious athletes to casual bikers and children. Sinch Bike models include:
Jaunt (for comfort and ease of use)
Mode (for on/off-road riding)
Rush (for commuting)
Junior (for the shorter rider)

See also
Avanti (bicycle company)
List of electric bicycle brands and manufacturers

References

External links

New Zealand brands
Electric bicycles
Cycle manufacturers of New Zealand